The 2023 Canarian regional election will be held on Sunday, 28 May 2023, to elect the 11th Parliament of the Autonomous Community of the Canary Islands. All 70 seats in the Parliament will be up for election. The election will be held simultaneously with regional elections in eleven other autonomous communities and local elections all throughout Spain.

Overview

Electoral system
The Parliament of the Canary Islands is the devolved, unicameral legislature of the autonomous community of the Canary Islands, having legislative power in regional matters as defined by the Spanish Constitution and the Canarian Statute of Autonomy, as well as the ability to vote confidence in or withdraw it from a regional president.

Voting for the Parliament is on the basis of universal suffrage, which comprises all nationals over 18 years of age, registered in the Canary Islands and in full enjoyment of their political rights. Additionally, Canarians abroad are required to apply for voting before being permitted to vote, a system known as "begged" or expat vote. The 70 members of the Parliament of the Canary Islands are elected using the D'Hondt method and a closed list proportional representation, with an electoral threshold of 15 percent of valid votes—which includes blank ballots—being applied in each constituency. Alternatively, parties can also enter the seat distribution as long as they reach four percent regionally. Seats are allocated to constituencies, corresponding to the islands of El Hierro, Fuerteventura, Gran Canaria, La Gomera, La Palma, Lanzarote and Tenerife, as well as an additional constituency comprising the whole archipelago, with each being allocated a fixed number of seats.

As a result of the aforementioned allocation, each constituency is provisionally entitled the following seats for the next regional election:

Election date
After legal amendments in 2018 and 2022, fixed-term mandates were abolished, instead allowing the term of the Parliament of the Canary Islands to expire after an early dissolution. The election decree shall be issued no later than the twenty-fifth day prior to the date of expiry of parliament and published on the following day in the Official Gazette of the Canary Islands (BOC), with election day taking place on the fifty-fourth day from publication. The previous election was held on 26 May 2019, which means that the legislature's term will expire on 26 May 2023. The election decree must be published in the BOC no later than 2 May 2023, with the election taking place on the fifty-fourth day from publication, setting the latest possible election date for the Parliament on Sunday, 25 June 2023.

The president has the prerogative to dissolve the Parliament of the Canary Islands and call a snap election, provided that no motion of no confidence is in process and that dissolution does not occur before one year has elapsed since the previous one. In the event of an investiture process failing to elect a regional president within a two-month period from the first ballot, the Parliament shall be automatically dissolved and a fresh election called. Any snap election held as a result of these circumstances will not alter the period to the next ordinary election, with elected deputies merely serving out what remains of their four-year terms.

Parliamentary composition
The table below shows the composition of the parliamentary groups in the Parliament at the present time.

Parties and candidates
The electoral law allows for parties and federations registered in the interior ministry, coalitions and groupings of electors to present lists of candidates. Parties and federations intending to form a coalition ahead of an election are required to inform the relevant Electoral Commission within ten days of the election call, whereas groupings of electors need to secure the signature of at least one percent of the electorate in the constituencies for which they seek election, disallowing electors from signing for more than one list of candidates.

Below is a list of the main parties and electoral alliances which will likely contest the election:

Opinion polls
The tables below list opinion polling results in reverse chronological order, showing the most recent first and using the dates when the survey fieldwork was done, as opposed to the date of publication. Where the fieldwork dates are unknown, the date of publication is given instead. The highest percentage figure in each polling survey is displayed with its background shaded in the leading party's colour. If a tie ensues, this is applied to the figures with the highest percentages. The "Lead" column on the right shows the percentage-point difference between the parties with the highest percentages in a poll.

Graphical summary

Voting intention estimates
The table below lists weighted voting intention estimates. Refusals are generally excluded from the party vote percentages, while question wording and the treatment of "don't know" responses and those not intending to vote may vary between polling organisations. When available, seat projections determined by the polling organisations are displayed below (or in place of) the percentages in a smaller font; 36 seats are required for an absolute majority in the Parliament of the Canary Islands.

Voting preferences
The table below lists raw, unweighted voting preferences.

Results

Overall

Notes

References
Opinion poll sources

Other

Canary Islands
Canary Islands
2020s